Beshariq is a city in Fergana Region, Uzbekistan. It is the administrative center of Beshariq District. The town population was 17,289 people in 1989, and 22,800 in 2016.

References

Populated places in Fergana Region
Cities in Uzbekistan